Célina Fradji (born 10 July 2005) is a French ice dancer. With her skating partner, Jean-Hans Fourneaux, she is the 2022 JGP France silver medalist, the 2022 French junior national champion, and finished in the top 10 at the 2022 World Junior Figure Skating Championships.

Personal life 
Fradji was born on 10 July 2005 in Arnajon, France. She is of Algerian descent. Her sister Kenza, seven years her senior, also competed in skating as a child.

Career

Early years 
Fradji began skating in 2010 at the age of four, inspired by her older sister. She began training in ice dance at 7½, but continued to compete as a single skater up to the advanced novice level through the 2018–19 season. She first met her current skating partner, Jean-Hans Fourneaux, when she was 11 years old, and the team began competing together internationally in 2017.

2019–20 season: Junior Grand Prix debut and Youth Olympics 

Fradji/Fourneaux made their Junior Grand Prix (JGP) circuit debut in August as one of the host picks at the 2019 JGP France. The team placed ninth in the rhythm dance and 10th in the free dance to finish 10th overall, the third ranked of the three French teams assigned to the event. While they did not receive a second JGP assignment, Fradji/Fourneaux placed fourth in the junior dance category at the domestic Master's de Patinage, and finished sixth and seventh respectively at their two fall junior B assignments, the 2019 Mezzaluna Cup and the 2019 Pavel Roman Memorial.

In January 2020, Fradji/Fourneaux competed at the 2020 Winter Youth Olympics in Lausanne, Switzerland. They were ninth in the rhythm dance and 10th in the free dance to place 10th overall in the individual event. Fradji/Fourneaux were named to Team Discovery, alongside Italian men's skater Nikolaj Memola, Canadian women's skater Catherine Carle, and Russian pair team Apollinariia Panfilova / Dmitry Rylov for the mixed NOC team trophy. The duo was seventh in the ice dance segment, contributing to Team Discovery's sixth place finish overall.

Fradji/Fourneaux concluded their season at the 2020 French Junior Championships, where they placed third behind Loïcia Demougeot / Théo Le Mercier and Lou Terreau / Noé Perron.

Programs

With Fourneaux

Competitive highlights 
JGP: Junior Grand Prix

With Fourneaux

References

External links 
 

2005 births
Living people
French female ice dancers
People from Brétigny-sur-Orge
21st-century French women